Danish Husain is the stage name of Murtaza Danish Husaini, an Indian actor, storyteller, poet and theatre director. He has also been credited as Dan Husain and Murtaza Danish Husain.

Early life, family and education
Murtaza Danish Husaini was born into a Muslim family. His mother was a professor of Persian literature at Delhi University. His father was an economist.

Danish graduated from Delhi University with degrees in economics and management.

Career
Husain's early career was in banking, but, dissatisfied, he turned to the performing arts when he was about 30 years old.

Husain joined Mahmood Farooqui (who began in 2005) to help revive Urdu storytelling, Dastangoi, and in 2016 developed Qissebaazi, multilingual storytelling. His theatre company in Mumbai is The Hoshruba Repertory.

He has performed in many feature films, including Dhobi Ghat (2010), Peepli Live (2010), Newton (2017), and Soorma (2018). He has also acted in televisions series, such as Taj Mahal 1989 (2020), Mai Hero Boll Raha Hu (2021) and Bard of Blood (2019).

Personal life
Husain resides in Mumbai.

Filmography

Films

Web-series

References

External links

21st-century Indian male actors
Male actors in Hindi cinema
Indian male film actors
Male actors from New Delhi
Living people
Year of birth missing (living people)

|}